Remix was a monthly magazine for DJs, audio engineers, record producers, and performers of electronic and hip-hop music. It was started in 1999 as a quarterly magazine and was published monthly beginning in January 2001. The magazine focused on recording and live-performance hardware, electronic music instruments, and music-production hardware and computer software. It was headquartered in Emeryville, California.

The final issue of Remix was dated January 2009.

References

Monthly magazines published in the United States
Music magazines published in the United States
Quarterly magazines published in the United States
Dance music magazines
Defunct magazines published in the United States
Magazines established in 1999
Magazines disestablished in 2009
Magazines published in Ohio
1999 establishments in Ohio